Uniontown Downtown Historic District is a national historic district located at Uniontown, Fayette County, Pennsylvania.  The district includes 113 contributing buildings and 1 contributing site in the central business district of Uniontown. Most of the contributing buildings were built between 1881 and 1932, and are representative of a number of popular architectural styles including Classical Revival, Moderne, Late Victorian, and Georgian.  Twenty-two buildings date between 1811 and 1860.  Notable buildings include the Fayette Bank Building (1902), Thompson-Ruby Building (1900), Highland House (1890), State Music Hall (1922), Exchange Hotel (1891), Galltin Apartments (1929), Gallatin Bank Building (1924), Federal Building (1930), Fayette County Courthouse (1892), County Building (1927), Central School (1916), and St. Peter's Episcopal Church (1884).

It was added to the National Register of Historic Places in 1989, with a boundary increase in 2003.

References

Georgian architecture in Pennsylvania
Moderne architecture in Pennsylvania
Historic districts in Fayette County, Pennsylvania
Uniontown, Pennsylvania
Historic districts on the National Register of Historic Places in Pennsylvania
National Register of Historic Places in Fayette County, Pennsylvania